is a 2017 Japanese legal thriller film edited, written, and directed by Hirokazu Kore-eda. It was screened in the main competition section of the 74th Venice International Film Festival.

Plot
Tomoaki Shigemori is a lawyer tasked with defending a client (Misumi), who faces the death penalty if found guilty, in a murder trial. Misumi has previous convictions for murder and has confessed to the crime, but evidence in the case leads to Shigemori having doubts about what really happened.

Cast

Production
Hirokazu Kore-eda was inspired to write a courtroom thriller after conversing with his friend, a lawyer, about the latter's experiences in court. Kore-eda learned that there's a gap between the Japanese people's perception of the court as a space where people aim for the truth, and what it actually is: a space for lawyers "to make adjustments to the conflict [of] interest." Kore-eda based the background of his script on the speculation of "what would happen if a lawyer really started wanting to know the truth?"

During the development process, writing the script was the hardest part for Kore-eda to tackle, due to his unfamiliarity with how lawyers worked in the justice system. He brought together seven lawyers over several months to stage mock trials and mock interviews of a criminal, while he took notes on their language and thought processes.

Besides the subject matter, another departure for Kore-eda was the film's use of the Cinemascope format, which he had not employed in his previous films.

Reception

Critical reception
On review aggregator website Rotten Tomatoes, The Third Murder holds an approval rating of 87% based on 83 reviews, with an average rating of 7.05/10. The website's critical consensus reads, "The Third Murder makes satisfying work of its weighty themes, even if it doesn't quite stand with writer-director Hirokazu Koreeda's best efforts." On Metacritic, the film has an average score of 66 out of 100, based on 12 critics, indicating "generally favorable reviews".

Deborah Young of The Hollywood Reporter gave a positive review of the film, stating that "though different in feeling from the Japanese writer-director's perceptive family tales like After the Storm, it has the same clarity of thought and precision of image as his very best work." Ben Sachs of the Chicago Reader gave the film four out of four stars, stating that upon a second viewing, "Kore-eda’s surprises seemed less like a screenwriter’s tricks than Dostoevskian revelations deepening everything that came before."

Accolades

References

External links
 

2017 films
2010s legal films
2010s thriller films
Japanese courtroom films
Films about lawyers
Films about rape
Films directed by Hirokazu Kore-eda
Films scored by Ludovico Einaudi
Films set in Tokyo
Incest in film
Japanese thriller films
Legal thriller films
Japanese vigilante films
2010s Japanese films